Daniel Lester Gauthier (born December 2, 1963)
 is an American actor best known for his roles as Kevin Buchanan on the ABC soap opera One Life to Live, Matt Liston on the sitcom Ellen for two seasons, Brad Powell in the 1989 film Teen Witch, and Chip on the sitcom Friends.

Early life
Gauthier was born in Prineville, Oregon.  He was inspired to act early on by his mother, who was a local theater actress in their Central Oregon home. By the time he turned 18, Gauthier moved to California to attend San Diego State University. He was recruited by SDSU's track team and was a decathlete. After college, Gauthier found work by modeling with the Ford and Nina Blanchard modeling agencies.

Career 
In 1987, he landed his first credited television role in 1987 in FOX's sitcom Married... with Children. Two years later, he starred in his first feature film, Teen Witch where he played the title character's love interest. That same year, he landed his most high-profile primetime role as maverick helicopter pilot, Johnny McKay in CBS's Tour of Duty. Following the end of the series, Gauthier continued to make guest appearances such television shows as Who's the Boss?, Life Goes On and Silk Stalkings. In 1993, he was cast in the comedy film Son in Law. He played Travis, the main character's steady boyfriend who reacts unhappily to her changes from college life. By 1995, he landed a regular role on a series titled Courthouse. The show portrayed the trials and tribulations of court life. After nine episodes, the series was canceled. From 1996 to 1997, Gauthier found recurring roles on both Ellen and Beverly Hills, 90210. In 1998, he was cast in the prime time soap opera Melrose Place.

Daytime television 
In June 2003, Gauthier became the eleventh actor to play former Lieutenant Governor Kevin Lord Riley Buchanan on the ABC soap opera One Life to Live, a role he portrayed until November 16, 2006. The character of Kevin had been a "good guy" for most of Gauthier's run, but in the last year had been written with more of a dark edge. The show chose not to renew Gauthier's contract and the character was written off; Gauthier was subsequently nominated for a Daytime Emmy Award for his performance. In August 2007, Gauthier made a brief return to One Life to Live for the series' 9,999th and 10,000th episodes.

Filmography

Award nominations 
Soap Opera Digest Awards
(2005) Soap Opera Digest Award Outstanding Male Newcomer for One Life to Live
Daytime Emmy Awards
(2007) Daytime Emmy Award Outstanding Supporting Actor for One Life to Live

References

External links
 Daytime Emmy interview - SOAPnet.com

1963 births
American male soap opera actors
American male television actors
Living people
People from Prineville, Oregon
Male models from Oregon